Mirfield railway station serves the town of Mirfield in West Yorkshire, England. It lies on the Huddersfield Line managed by Northern and by Grand Central and recently it has been served by TransPennine Express.

The platforms have an unusual configuration. Platforms 1 and 2 form an island platform on the western side of the bridge over Station Road/Hopton New Road. Trains from Platform 1 go to Leeds and Wakefield Westgate (eastbound); Platform 2 is rarely used for normal scheduled services but is passed by non-stopping westbound trains to Huddersfield. The train to Leeds takes around 25 minutes and to reach Huddersfield takes around 10 minutes.

History 

The town received its first railway in 1840, when the Manchester and Leeds Railway opened the first section of its cross-Pennine main line between Normanton and Hebden Bridge (completing it through to Manchester on 1 March 1841). It did not actually get a station though until April 1845, when the company opened one shortly before submitting plans to Parliament to build a branch line from the town along the Spen Valley to Bradford via Cleckheaton. By this time further lines had been opened from nearby Heaton Lodge Junction to Huddersfield by the Huddersfield & Manchester Railway (opened on 3 August 1847) and from Thornhill to Leeds by the Leeds, Dewsbury & Manchester Railway (opened 18 September 1848). The LNWR (which had absorbed both the H&M and LD&M by 1849) had originally planned to build its own route through Mirfield, but after negotiations with the Lancashire and Yorkshire Railway (successors to the M&L) agreed to not to go ahead in return for the granting of running powers over the Thornhill to Heaton Lodge section (and also allowing the L&Y access to Huddersfield).
This meant that the railway passing through the town soon became extremely congested, carrying as it did the traffic on two main trunk routes between Manchester and Leeds (the Huddersfield & Manchester company having completed its route through Stalybridge in August 1849) and it led to the station gaining   a notorious reputation for delays. This persisted even after the Heaton Lodge - Thornhill section was quadrupled in 1884, and it was not until the LNWR opened an alternative Huddersfield to Leeds route at the turn of the century that the situation began to improve. To facilitate interchange, a new station was built  to the east of the original; the contract for the station (excluding roof) was placed on 25 May 1864, the roof contract being placed on 26 April 1865. The new station centred on a large island platform with overall roof, and facilities included a hotel, buffet and billiard room; it opened on 5 March 1866.

It has also lost its buildings to demolition (in the mid-1980s) and one of its four tracks but gained the aforementioned third platform as part of a set of capacity improvements in the late 1980s.

Facilities
The station is unstaffed and has a ticket machine available on the platform.  Digital display screens, timetable posters and automated announcements provide train running information.  Shelters are provided on each platform, but only platform 3 has step-free access (from the station car park).  Access to the older island platform is via a subway with stairs up to platform level.  Platform 3 is to be extended by December 2018 as part of a Network Rail plan to extend more than 100 platforms at 70 stations across the north of England.

Services

Northern
Eastbound from Mirfield, an hourly service to Leeds.

There is also an hourly daytime service to Manchester Victoria and  via  and  - this was introduced as part of the December 2008 timetable alterations on the Calder Valley Line.

There are no Northern services on a Sunday.

TransPennine Express
Since the May 2018 timetable change, TransPennine Express services now call here hourly each direction seven days per week.  Eastbound trains serve most local stations to Leeds, whilst westbound trains call at Deighton and Huddersfield (direct services west of there ended at the December 2018 timetable change).

Grand Central – West Riding
The station sees a number of direct services to London Kings Cross via Wakefield Kirkgate, Pontefract and Doncaster, which commenced on 23 May 2010. In January 2009, Grand Central Railway had their application for train paths to run a Bradford Interchange (via Halifax and Brighouse) to London service accepted by the Office of Rail Regulation.  In the December 2017 timetable, four trains call in each direction throughout the week (including Sundays). This service temporarily stopped during the COVID-19 pandemic season but in December 2020 started to see a return.

Future

In February 2019, it was revealed that Mirfield was in line for a new station as part of the £3 billion TransPennine Route Upgrade. The plans involve the reconstruction of the current platforms 1 and 2 on what will become the 'slow' lines between Heaton Lodge and Thornhill LNW junctions, along with the restoration of the fourth line to complete the 'fast' lines between those two points. The existing platform 3 would be demolished under this scheme.

Notes

References

External links 

Railway stations in Kirklees
DfT Category F1 stations
Former Lancashire and Yorkshire Railway stations
Railway stations in Great Britain opened in 1845
Railway stations in Great Britain closed in 1866
Railway stations in Great Britain opened in 1866
Railway stations served by Grand Central Railway
Northern franchise railway stations
1866 establishments in England
Railway stations served by TransPennine Express